The year 1913 in archaeology involved some significant events.

Excavations
 Excavations at Shechem by a German team begin.
 Excavations at Etemenanki by Robert Koldewey begin.

Publications
 April National Geographic Magazine is entirely devoted to the discoveries of Hiram Bingham III at Machu Picchu.
 E. Thurlow Leeds - The Archaeology of the Anglo-Saxon Settlements.

Finds
 Remains of the 14th century David's Tower at Edinburgh Castle, Scotland, are discovered.

Events
 The Neolithic site at Skara Brae on Mainland, Orkney (Scotland) is plundered.

Births
 February 6 - Mary Leakey, English paleoanthropologist working in Africa (d. 1996).
 March 7 - Gordon Willey, American archaeologist working in the Americas (d. 2002).
 November 12 - Kenneth Steer, British archaeologist and British Army officer (d. 2007).

Deaths
 April 19 - Hugo Winckler, German Assyriologist (b. 1863).
 May 28 - John Lubbock, 1st Baron Avebury, English prehistorian (b. 1834).

References

Archaeology
Archaeology
Archaeology by year